"What Good Am I Without You" is a Motown duet between singers Marvin Gaye and Kim Weston. The song was released as a single in late 1964 and became the first duet Marvin and Kim recorded, a couple of years before the duo recorded the breakthrough hit, "It Takes Two". The song came after the departure of Mary Wells, who had left Motown that year shortly after releasing a successful duet album with Gaye. The single was featured on Gaye and Weston's only LP together, Take Two and peaked at number 61 on the Billboard Hot 100 (and number 28 on the Cashbox R&B chart) when it was released. The single was co-written and produced by William "Mickey" Stevenson. The b-side, "I Want You 'Round", was also included on  Take Two.

According to Billboard, the "lyrics carry great tale and story is well told by [the] duo to powerful rock beat."

Credits
Lead vocals by Marvin Gaye and Kim Weston
Background vocals by The Andantes: Marlene Barrow, Jackie Hicks and Louvain Demps
Produced by William "Mickey" Stevenson
Instrumentation by The Funk Brothers

References

1964 singles
1964 songs
Male–female vocal duets
Marvin Gaye songs
Songs written by William "Mickey" Stevenson
Tamla Records singles